Žemlovka, žemľovka or Scheiterhaufen (in common language: zemlbába) is a sweet bread pudding made of apples and rohlíks or veka, soaked in sweet milk.

Another variant uses pears instead of apples. The meal is a traditional part of Czech and Slovak cuisine and often appears in canteens.

Classic Preparation
Rohlíks or veka are sliced and immersed in milk that is flavoured with sugar, vanilla sugar, and ground cinnamon. A layer of wet pastry is put in the bottom of a roaster; a layer of fruit is spread on top. Several layers are stacked; the top layer is always pastry.

Fruit is sprinkled with sugar, ground cinnamon and/or raisins. The mixture is baked until a golden crust forms on the top.

Žemlovka can be eaten both warm and cold.

External links 
 Žemlovka - nejlepší recepty | Žemlovka.cz 

Czech pastries
Apple dishes
Bread puddings